Ukraine women's national goalball team is the women's national team of Ukraine.  Goalball is a team sport designed specifically for athletes with a vision impairment.  The team takes part in international competitions.

IBSA World Games

2003 Quebec City  

The team competed in the 2003 IBSA World Games from Friday 1 to Sunday 10 August 2011, in Quebec City, Canada.  Ten teams competed.  The first stage was pool play with 5 teams per pool and the top two teams in each pool advancing to the next round.

2007 São Paulo 

The team competed in the 2007 IBSA World Games, from 28 July 2007 to 8 August 2007, in São Paulo, Brazil.  There were twenty-three men's and twelve women's teams.  The competition was a 2008 Summer Paralympics qualifying event.  Olena Vertikova was fourth in the competition in scoring with 18 points.

Regional championships 

The team competes in the IBSA Europe goalball region.

The 2001 European Championships were held in Neerpelt, Belgium with six teams competing.  The team finished sixth. In 2005, the European Championships were held in Neerpelt, Belgium.  With ten teams competing, the team finished eighth. 

The Turkish Blind Sports Federation hosted the 2007 IBSA Goalball European Championships in Anyalya, Turkey with 11 teams contesting the women's competition. The team finished third. Munich, Germany hosted the 2009 European Championships with eleven teams taking part.  The team finished the event in tenth place. 

Six teams took part in the 2010 IBSA European Championships Goalball Women B tournament held in Eskişehir, Turkey in July.  The team finished first. 

The team competed at the 2013 European Championships in Turkey, where they finished sixth.

Goal scoring by competition

Competitive history 
The table below contains individual game results for the team in international matches and competitions.

See also 

 Disabled sports 
 Ukraine men's national goalball team
 Ukraine at the Paralympics

References

Goalball
National women's goalball teams
Ukraine at the Paralympics
European national goalball teams